Xiangqishan Village, literally "Elephant Chess Mountain Village", is an administrative village under the jurisdiction of Fuzihe Town, Macheng City, Huanggang City, Hubei Province, China. The grassroots mass autonomous organization in which the village is located is the Xiangqishan Villagers' Committee,  whose urban-rural classification code is 220.

References

Village-level divisions of Hubei
Huanggang